Freddie Spruell (December 28, 1893 – June 19, 1956) was an American Delta blues guitarist and singer, variously billed as Papa Freddie or Mr. Freddie. He is generally regarded as the first Delta bluesman to be recorded ("Milk Cow Blues", 1926), although Mamie Smith (1920), Ed Andrews (1923) and Blind Lemon Jefferson (1925) predated him in recording the first blues records. Details of his life are sketchy and sometimes contradictory.

Biography
Spruell was probably born in Lake Providence, Louisiana. He relocated with his family to Chicago, Illinois, when he was a young child. His Social Security records gave his birth date as December 1893. In spite of his urban residence, his recordings are classed as Delta blues and are noted for his musical styling. On June 25, 1926, Spruell recorded "Milk Cow Blues" in Chicago. The track was released by Okeh Records, backed with "Muddy Water Blues", recorded in November that year; both sides were credited to Papa Freddie. His second single release was "Way Back Down Home", backed with the same recording of "Muddy Water Blues". He recorded two more songs in 1928, one of which was "Tom Cat Blues", issued by Paramount Records and credited to Mr. Freddie Spruell. Five more songs were recorded in April 1935 and released by Bluebird Records under the name of Mr. Freddie. In this session he recorded "Let's Go Riding", his best-known song. Carl Martin played second guitar accompanying Spruell on the track. At the insistence of his mother, Spruell stopped playing secular music in the mid-1940s. He became a Baptist preacher. Spruell died in Chicago in June 1956, after a lengthy stay in hospital. He was aged 62. No death certificate has been found. All his recorded work is on the compilation album Mississippi Blues, Vol. 2 (1926–1935), The Complete Recorded Works of Arthur Petties, Freddie Spruell, Willie "Poor Boy" Lofton.

Legacy
"Let's Go Riding" was used in the soundtrack of the 2001 film Ghost World.

Discography

Mississippi Blues, vol. 2 (1926–1935), The Complete Recorded Works of Arthur Petties, Freddie Spruell, Willie "Poor Boy" Lofton, Document Records, 1994

See also
List of Delta blues musicians

References

External links
Mini biography at thebluestrail.com
Illustrated Freddie Spruell discography

1893 births
1956 deaths
American blues singers
American blues guitarists
American male guitarists
Songwriters from Louisiana
Singers from Louisiana
Delta blues musicians
Country blues musicians
Paramount Records artists
Bluebird Records artists
Songwriters from Illinois
Singers from Chicago
People from Lake Providence, Louisiana
20th-century American guitarists
Guitarists from Chicago
Guitarists from Louisiana
African-American male songwriters
African-American guitarists
20th-century African-American male singers
Okeh Records artists